Jeri Warner Weil (born May 15, 1948) is an American former child actress, best known for her role as Judy Hensler in the classic television series Leave It to Beaver.

Acting career
Prior to being cast on Leave It to Beaver, California-born Weil had appeared in two TV series and six films in uncredited roles.  Among the films she appeared in was The Eddie Cantor Story as one of Cantor's daughters.  The role of Judy Hensler cast her as a classmate and nemesis of Theodore Cleaver ("The Beaver"). Including the show's pilot, Weil appeared in 31 of the 234 Leave It to Beaver episodes.  In 1956 Weil appeared in an uncredited role as Linda Hutchins in the western movie The Fastest Gun Alive starring Glenn Ford.

In 1983, as a result of a revival of the Leave It to Beaver series on television and film, Weil appeared on the Match Game-Hollywood Squares Hour as a game show participant / celebrity guest star. She also reprised her role as Judy Hensler (Benton) in a single guest appearance on a 1987 episode of the revival series The New Leave it to Beaver.

Personal life
Weil quit acting when she was dropped from Leave It to Beaver in October 1960.  She is currently a writer as well as realtor with Prudential John Aaroe and Associates Realty in the Studio City area of Los Angeles.

References

External links

Living people
1948 births
Actresses from Los Angeles
American television actresses
American child actresses
Writers from Los Angeles
21st-century American women